Channel Rock is a rock which lies in the northwest entrance to Meek Channel in the Argentine Islands, Wilhelm Archipelago. Charted and named in 1935 by the British Graham Land Expedition (BGLE) under Rymill.

Geography of Antarctica